Morellato Group is an Italian corporate group that designs and manufactures design jewellery and watches. The group's parent company was founded by Giulio Morellato initially in Bologna and later was moved to near Padova.

History
Morellato started operations in the 1930s as a maker of watch straps.

In 1990, Massimo Carraro bought the small family watchmaking business from his father and two partners.

In April 2014, Morellato signed an alliance with Spanish watchmaker Geresa, making the new joint-venture Spain's second biggest watchmaker, after Rolex. The two companies invested $70 million in the new venture. Through that deal, Morellato got Geresa's distribution networks, but 50% of Morellato Group's holding company (Morellato &Sector S.A) became the property of Geresa. 

The Morellato Group and Pepe Jeans London signed an agreement for the production and worldwide distribution of watches Pepe Jeans London branded that started during autumn 2014. In 2015, Morellato partnered with Trussardi to create the T01 collection. In February 2016, luxury brand Furla launched a new collection of watches designed by Morellato. Morellato also chose Grenchen Time as its distributor for the UK.

Over the following years, Morellato bought European jewellery retail chains Mister Watch (2019), Cleor (2019), and Christ Group (2023).

Activities
The group is present on the Italian and international market with  brands of property and brands in license such as Just Cavalli, Furla and Maserati. It is also one of the leading global manufacturer of watch straps and cases for jewelry, which constitute the original activity of Morellato since 1930. Morellato’s focus markets are Europe, the Middle East and Asia, with a particular concentration on China.

Besides headquarters in Fratte di Santa Giustina in Colle in the province of Padova with the design and marketing offices in Milan, the group is divided into a number of branches in the USA, Germany, France, Spain, Switzerland and Hong Kong; it is also present, through some joint ventures, in China, United Arab Emirates (Morellato Middle East) and India. 

Since 1995, 5 million pieces were sold every year. In 2005, the group successfully started to expand its production in jewelry and watches.

In 2012, the group reported a $23 million profit margin on its sales of $250 million (up from $21 million the year before). In 2013, the group was ranked 17th in worldwide sales.

Subsidiaries
The following companies are wholly owned subsidiaries of Morellato Group:
Morellato
Sector No Limits
Philip Watch
Chronostar
Bluespirit
Pianegonda joy
Morellato Middle East

References

External links
 Official website

Companies based in Veneto
Jewellery companies of Italy
Jewellery retailers of Italy
Watchmaking conglomerates
Watch manufacturing companies of Italy
Design companies established in 1930
Italian brands
Manufacturing companies established in 1930
Italian companies established in 1930
Corporate groups